Shick may refer to:

Rob Shick (born 1957), Canadian National Hockey League referee 
Shick Shack (c. 1727 – c. 1835) was a 19th-century Potawatomi chieftain
Nicholas Newman and Sharon Collins, a popular supercouple on the American soap opera The Young and the Restless, often called Shick

See also
Schick (disambiguation)